Queponco is a historic United States railway station located at 8378 Patey Woods Road, Newark, Worcester County, Maryland. Constructed by the Pennsylvania Railroad, the Queponco railway station served Snow Hill, Berlin and Newark communities.  The station closed in the 1960s.

Queponco was listed on the National Register of Historic Places in 1996 as the Queponco railway station.

Museum
The Queponco railway station preserves railroad heritage in the area and exhibits vintage railroad memorabilia and equipment.

References

External links
, including photo from 1993, at Maryland Historical Trust
Queponco Railway Station (Ocean City Vacation and Hotels Guide website)

Railroad museums in Maryland
Railway stations on the National Register of Historic Places in Maryland
Railway stations in the United States opened in 1910
Museums in Worcester County, Maryland
Former Pennsylvania Railroad stations
National Register of Historic Places in Worcester County, Maryland
Transportation buildings and structures in Worcester County, Maryland
1910 establishments in Maryland
Former railway stations in Maryland